Streptomyces bikiniensis is a bacterium species from the genus Streptomyces which has isolated from soil from the island Bikini atoll. Streptomyces bikiniensis produces streptomycin II and 
carboxypeptidase.

See also 
 List of Streptomyces species

References

Further reading

External links
Type strain of Streptomyces bikiniensis at BacDive -  the Bacterial Diversity Metadatabase

bikiniensis
Bacteria described in 1947